Governor Alfred E. Smith Houses, or the Alfred E. Smith Houses. is a public housing development built by the New York City Housing Authority in the Two Bridges neighborhood of the Lower East Side of Manhattan. There are 12 buildings in the complex; all are 17 stories tall. The grounds are bordered by St. James Place to the west, Madison Street to the north, Catherine Street to the east, and South Street to the south.

About 
The razing of buildings for the construction of the complex began in 1950, and the buildings were completed on April 1, 1953.

The development was named after four-time New York Governor Al Smith (1873–1944), the first Catholic to win a Presidential nomination by a major political party, and a social reformer who made progress in the areas of better living and working conditions. Smith served as governor from 1919–1920 and 1923–1929, and was nominated unsuccessfully by the Democratic Party in 1928, with Joseph Taylor Robinson as his running mate. Nearby are the Alfred E. Smith Park, a  park with memorials for Governor Smith located at the corner of South St, Catherine Slip, and Madison St, the Alfred E. Smith Recreational Center, which has community rooms and a gymnasium, and P.S. 126.

Of the residents at the Governor Alfred E. Smith Houses, 30% are elderly, the highest such percentage of all public housing developments in New York City.

Notable people 

 Luther Vandross (1951 – 2005), singer and record producer.
 Michael Che (born 1983), comedian.

See also
New York City Housing Authority
List of New York City Housing Authority properties

References

External links

Public housing in Manhattan
Residential buildings completed in 1953
Lower East Side
Eggers & Higgins buildings
Residential buildings in Manhattan